"Any Way You Look" is a 1997 single by the Britpop band Northern Uproar. It was the first to be released from their second album Yesterday, Tomorrow, Today. It peaked at number 36 on the UK Top 40 singles chart in May 1997. The song has a noticeable Motown influence

1997 singles
Northern Uproar songs
1997 songs
Song articles with missing songwriters